An Old Lady Dies is a 1934 mystery detective novel by Anthony Gilbert, the pen name of British writer Lucy Beatrice Malleson.  It is the ninth of ten novels in a series featuring her amateur detective and politician Scott Egerton, a precursor to her better known creation Arthur Crook. It was reviewed in the Sunday Times by Dorothy L. Sayers.

Synopsis
A wealthy old lady enjoys keeping her impecunious relatives on tenterhooks about her will, enjoying the power she wields over them. When she dies from an overdose of morphine her niece is arrested by the police.

References

Bibliography
 Magill, Frank Northen . Critical Survey of Mystery and Detective Fiction: Authors, Volume 2. Salem Press, 1988.
Murphy, Bruce F. The Encyclopedia of Murder and Mystery. Springer, 1999.
 Reilly, John M. Twentieth Century Crime & Mystery Writers. Springer, 2015.

1934 British novels
British mystery novels
British thriller novels
Novels by Anthony Gilbert
Novels set in London
British detective novels
Collins Crime Club books